Darca Schools (Darca, "The Path" in Aramaic) is a non-profit organization operating a network of 40 schools and learning centers located in Israel's geographic and socio-economic periphery.

History 

The Darca Network was established in Israel by the Alliance Israélite Universelle and Rashi Foundation in 2010. In June 2014 Darca Schools Network formed an alliance with YRF Israel. YRF - Youth Renewal Fund is the philanthropic funding partner for the Darca Schools Network. Darca is sustained by donations from Israeli and international foundations, businesses, and individuals, in addition to the budget provided by the Israeli Ministry of Education. Darca's primary goal is to strengthen under-served communities in Israel's periphery by strengthening the local education system, specifically in high schools. There is an emphasis on funding these schools in "geo-social periphery" to make them competitive with schools in affluent communities.

The Darca Network serves all sectors of Israeli society. It operates and manages 43 schools and two "learning centers" nationwide, including five schools under its pedagogical auspices. A significant portion of the network's resources are invested in the development of programs to support school leadership teams, while simultaneously promoting academic achievement, social values and social responsibility. Darca offers its teachers continuous training programs so that they can effectively convey and teach humanitarian and democratic values to students, as well as to provide high level studies in STEM, English, Literature and all other academic subjects .

DARCA is a not-for-profit organization supported by donations from foundations, corporations and individuals in Israel and abroad, in addition to the budget provided by the Ministry of Education. Dr. Gil Pereg has been the CEO of the Darca Network since its inception. Darca's former chairmen were Avigdor Willenz and Eli Alaluf, and Darca's current chairman is Jimmy Pinto. 

In April 2017, the Ministry of Education released their rankings of the education networks operating in Israel. According to the rating, the Darca Network was ranked first among the six networks in measures of eligibility for matriculation, excellence on Bagrut (matriculation) exams, and in the study of high level mathematics and English. In the years that followed, Darca continued to lead in many measures of excellence and quality in education and succeeded in maintaining consistency in its achievements. In August 2018 and August 2019, the Darca Network was ranked first in the network quality index for the second and third consecutive years. The network’s success is impressive in light of the fact that it began operating in 2011, mainly in disadvantaged communities and neighborhoods. Today, the average matriculation rate among Darca’s schools has reached 93%, significantly higher than the national average.
Darca Schools is led by Dr. Gil Pereg, practicing CEO since its foundation, and Jimmy Pinto, Chairman.

Darca schools 
 Makif Daled Darca, Ashkelon
 Makif He' Darca, Ashkelon
 Makif Vav Darca, Ashkelon
 Darca New High School - Bat Yam
 Hammer Darca High School - Bat Yam
 Bait V'Gan Darca High School - Bat Yam
 Makif Darca, Daliyat al-Karmel
 Zinman Darca High School, Dimona
 Appleman Darca High School, Dimona
 Liheman Darca High School, Dimona
 Technologi Darca High School, Dimona
 Achva Darca High School, Dimona
 Darca Nachala Ulpana School - Elad
 Darca Ilan and Asaf Ramon High School - Gedera
 Netivei Noam Darca Religious Educational Campus - Gedera
 Darca Menachem Begin High School - Gedera
 Yeshivat Bnei Issachar Darca High School, Hof Ashkelon
 Shikma Darca High School, Hof Ashkelon
 Darca Midrasha of the Arts, Sciences, and Social Leadership.
 Rene Cassin Darca, Jerusalem
 Orayta Haredi Yeshiva High School, Jerusalem
 Darca Julis
 Gymnasia Darca, Kiryat Malachi
 Maxim Levy Darca High School - Lod
 Darca High School - Netivot
 Yeshivat Darca Netivot
 Darca Hammer - Netivot
 Darca Hatzvi - Netivot
 Darca Ulpana - Netivot
 Geon HaYarden Darca school – Valley of Springs
 Shaked Darca Secondary School - Valley of Springs
 Darca Druze High School for Science and Leadership, Yarka
 Darca Sapir Yeruham
 Darca Beit Yerah, Jordan Valley
 Darca Nofey Golan, Katzrin

Pedagogical and educational auspices 
 Einstein High School  Ben Shemen Youth Village
 Mikveh Israel High School
 Mikveh Israel Religious School
 Mikveh Israel France-Israel School

English learning centers 
 The Clair and Emanuel Rosenblatt English Center, Tirat Carmel
 Ethan H. Freed Learning Center, Ramla

See also 
 Bagrut
 Education in Israel
 Israel's National Student and Youth Council
 Ministry of Education (Israel)
 The Knesset Committee on Education, Culture and Sport

References

External links 
 Darca website

Educational organizations based in Israel
International schools in Israel
Schools in Israel
Non-profit organizations based in Israel